Alice Victoria Rose Chater (born 5 April 1995) is a British singer, songwriter and dancer.

After releasing covers online throughout the mid-2010s, she eventually signed to Virgin EMI. Since then, she has released several singles, including "Lola" by Iggy Azalea and "Got It All" by Professor Green. She peaked at #3 on US Billboard Next Big Sound Chart. Alice collaborated with Professor Green on 'Got It All', a song that hit No.2 on UK iTunes, trended at No.6 on YouTube and was added to Hot Hits UK on Spotify. It was also her first entry on official singles chart in the UK, peaking at #48 and spent a total of three weeks on the chart. The same year she headlined as one of the front acts of Céline Dion's show at BST Hyde Park music festival. Furthermore, Chater has performed across the UK with full-throttle performances including the Mighty Hoopla festival and Brighton Pride alongside Kylie Minogue. In September 2019, Alice set out on her first UK headline tour, which included her second sold out London show. Gay Times UK hailed her as "Britain’s new pop princess".

Life and career 
Chater attended the Italia Conti Academy of Theatre Arts in London and signed a recording contract with Virgin EMI Records in 2017.

She has written songs with songwriters and producers including Rami Yacoub, Carl Falk, Mark Ralph, Kee Ingrosso and Rachel Furner.

Chater released three covers in 2017 before releasing her own original music, covering "More Than You Know" by Axwell & Ingrosso which originally featured uncredited production by LIOHN & Salvatlre and uncredited vocals from Kristoffer Fogelmark. This was followed by a cover of Mariah Carey's "Vision Of Love" and Madonna's "Hung Up".

She released her visual introduction video "My Name Is Alice" in April 2018, followed by the release of her first single, "Girls x Boys", later that month. The second 2018 single, titled "Heartbreak Hotel", includes a sample from Anita Ward's 1979 song "Ring My Bell". Her third single, "Hourglass", was released 3 October 2018 and samples the Human League's 1981 hit, "Don't You Want Me", as well as Allie X's 2016 song "Casanova". Two singles, "Wonderland (My Name Is Alice)", and "Thief", were released on 11 January 2019 and 18 January 2019 respectively.

On 2 August 2019, she released her single, "Tonight" along with a music video on YouTube.

Chater released the collaboration "Lola" with Australian rapper Iggy Azalea in November 2019. The song charted in the UK, the US, Scotland, and New Zealand. The duo performed the song at the International Music Awards in Berlin, Germany.

On 21 May 2020, she released another solo single "Two Of Us", with a video for the song following a week after on 28 May. Bizu Yaregal from Euphoriazine gave it a positive review saying, “Two Of Us” is best described as devastatingly beautiful, and shows a different and more stripped-back side to the performer. Produced by MYKL (who has worked with the likes of Zayn Malik and Mabel) the song talks about a relationship that is ending, and such a personal topic pushes Chater to showcase the best of her extraordinary vocal ability.

On 24 July that same year, she released the promotional single "Pretty In Pink", which featured a lyric video and talked about self-empowerment, which led up to August 7, where she released her EP "Aries".

She also has a Christmas song where she covers Leona Lewis. The cover is titled "One More Sleep", released on the 21st of December 2020. She is featured on "N.Y.E." from Iggy Azalea's deluxe version of "The End of an Era" which was released in September 2021.

Personal life
Chater was inspired to sing as a child by her parents' opera collection, as well as singers Mariah Carey, Whitney Houston and Christina Aguilera. She cites Etta James, Katy Perry and Madonna as influences. In an interview in late 2019, Chater was asked the inspirations that played a part in the music she create, the pop singer said that she was inspired by Christina Aguilera, Céline Dion and Whitney Houston vocally and Michael Jackson and Britney Spears on her moves.

Discography

Extended plays

Singles

As lead artist

As featured artist

Promotional singles

Guest appearances

Notes

References 

British women singer-songwriters
British women pop singers
Living people
1995 births